Milburn is an unincorporated community in Sanpete County, Utah, United States.

Description

The settlement is mainly an outgrowth of Fairview on the San Pitch River. Milburn has had several names in the past such as Milborn and Millburn, all of which were related in some way to the early sawmills built at the mouth of nearby canyons. Today, Milburn is mostly an agricultural region.

See also

References

External links

Unincorporated communities in Sanpete County, Utah
Unincorporated communities in Utah